Juan José 'Juanjo' Pereira Zambrano (born 19 March 1984) is a Spanish footballer who plays for Extremadura UD as a midfielder.

Club career
Born in Ontinyent, Valencia, Pereira spent his first 8 seasons as a senior alternating between Segunda División B and Tercera División. He represented in the process Valencia CF C, CD Teruel, Ontinyent CF, CF Extremadura, Orihuela CF (two stints), UD Lanzarote and Cultural y Deportiva Leonesa.

On 1 February 2010 Pereira signed with Albacete Balompié, in Segunda División. He made his division debut on the 13th, in a 1–1 home draw against CD Castellón. He finished the season with 11 appearances (6 starts, 615 minutes of action).

Pereira returned to the lower levels in the following years, representing CD San Roque de Lepe, AD Ceuta, CD Alcoyano, Ontinyent, SD Rayo Cantabria and Extremadura UD.

References

External links

1984 births
Living people
Spanish footballers
Footballers from the Valencian Community
Association football midfielders
Segunda División players
Segunda División B players
Tercera División players
CF Extremadura footballers
Orihuela CF players
Ontinyent CF players
Cultural Leonesa footballers
Albacete Balompié players
CD Alcoyano footballers
Deportivo Rayo Cantabria players
Extremadura UD footballers